KRFP (90.3 FM) is a community radio station licensed to Moscow, Idaho, United States. The station is owned by Radio Free Moscow, Inc.

The station went on the air as a low-power station on October 12, 2004, broadcasting at 100 watts from 116 E. 3rd St., Moscow, Idaho.  In 2009, the studio moved to 114 E 3rd St. in Moscow, but the broadcast antenna remained in the same location.  In addition to FM broadcasting, the station also streams its broadcasts on the Internet, and has a lot of audio on its Web site, including its evening newscast, the KRFP Evening Report, which was first produced on November 1, 2005.

On November 10, 2010, Radio Free Moscow received a U.S. Federal Communications Commission (FCC) construction permit to build a 270-watt full-power station at 90.3 FM, broadcasting from Paradise Ridge, south of Moscow.  The construction permit stipulates that Radio Free Moscow "shall cease operation of, and divest itself of all interest in, low power FM station KRFP-LP" prior to beginning program tests of the new station.

On November 1, 2011, the FCC granted a minor modification to the Full-Power construction permit. Instead of being limited to 270 watts, the station is now allowed to build a 1,100 watt facility. The station completed its transition to 90.3 on November 4, 2013, but at the lower power of 42 watts. It has since entered a campaign to step up to 1,100 watts.

It is the home of "Earthling Epics from the Final Frontier" and "Yin Radio" original radio programs.  It is a Pacifica Radio affiliate station.

See also
List of community radio stations in the United States
List of Pacifica Radio stations and affiliates

References

External links

RFP
Community radio stations in the United States
Moscow, Idaho
Radio stations established in 2004
2004 establishments in Idaho